Boossa is a small town on the south coast of Sri Lanka, located in the Galle District of the Southern Province.

Boossa was affected by the tsunami caused by the 2004 Indian Ocean earthquake with 28 known deaths.

Transport
Boossa is located on the Coastal or Southern Rail Line (connecting Colombo through to Matara), and the A2 highway, connecting Colombo to Wellawaya.

Facilities
 Boossa Regimental Training School
 Boossa Sri Lanka Navy Training Centre (Nipuna Camp)
 Boossa Detention Centre
 Boossa railway station

Attractions
 Boossa beach
  Jayawardanaramaya Buddhist temple, which was built by the monk Medankara and his grandfather Mohandiram Mudeyanselage Janis de Silva in 1700 A.C. The Pagoda is the only one in Sri Lanka constructed out of stone in 1805 A.C.

Post and telephone
 Sri Lanka 00 94
 Area code 09
 Postal code 80270

Other
The headquarters of the 58 Division are located in the town.

See also
 List of towns in Southern Province, Sri Lanka
 List of beaches in Sri Lanka

References

Populated places in Galle District
Populated places in Southern Province, Sri Lanka
Seaside resorts in Sri Lanka